Mihaela Horvat (born 21 March 1994) is a Croatian footballer who plays as a midfielder and has appeared for the Croatia women's national team.

Career
Horvat has been capped for the Croatia national team, appearing for the team during the 2019 FIFA Women's World Cup qualifying cycle.

References

External links
 
 
 

1994 births
Living people
Croatian women's footballers
Croatia women's international footballers
Women's association football midfielders
Croatian expatriate women's footballers
Expatriate women's footballers in Italy
Croatian expatriate sportspeople in Italy
Hellas Verona Women players
Serie A (women's football) players